Livingston's Hideout was most likely the only permanent Confederate military camp inside Kansas during the Civil War. It was in the very corner of southeast Kansas, in the very corner of Cherokee County, Kansas. Thomas R. Livingston became a leader of a group of Confederate guerrillas in the area, becoming first a captain and then a major. He needed locations to hide himself and his guerrillas from pursuing Union troops and this hideout suited the guerrillas well. The guerrillas sought to spy on Union forces and raiding units he found small enough to defeat.

No one knows when Livingston found his hideout, but he possibly began using it in spring 1862. No Union troops knew of its existence during the Civil War. The campsite was in a heavily wooded area. The area of the campsite cannot be seen from the road, as it is in the woods and the area beyond the road drops off sharply before the camp begins. The site is flat and somewhat oval shaped. The creek runs through a long valley. This camp would have been almost in plain sight, yet invisible.

The use of Livingston's hideout proved a great frustration for the area's Union troops. Many times the troops chased the guerrillas, only to have them scatter and seemingly vanish. The hideout was used at least July 1863, when Livingston was killed in a fight with Union troops in Stockton, Missouri. After its use ceased, it was not rediscovered until after the War. Eventually, in the 1980s someone decided to build a house there and Betty Kyrias, of the Baxter Springs Historical Society, discovered the site yet again.

References

Forts in Kansas
Buildings and structures in Cherokee County, Kansas
1862 establishments in Kansas